Vining is a city in Tama County, Iowa, United States. The population was 54 at the time of the 2020 census.

Geography
Vining is located at  (41.990228, -92.384720).

Demographics

2010 census
As of the census of 2010, there were 50 people, 24 households, and 16 families living in the city. The racial makeup of the city was 90.0% White and 10.0% Native American.

There were 24 households, of which 25.0% had children under the age of 18 living with them, 54.2% were married couples living together, 12.5% had a female householder with no husband present, and 33.3% were non-families. 29.2% of all households were made up of individuals. The average household size was 2.08 and the average family size was 2.56.

The median age in the city was 50.5 years. 18% of residents were under the age of 18; 2% were between the ages of 18 and 24; 22% were from 25 to 44; 42% were from 45 to 64; and 16% were 65 years of age or older. The gender makeup of the city was 52.0% male and 48.0% female.

2000 census
As of the census of 2000, there were 70 people, 30 households, and 21 families living in the city. The racial makeup of the city was 98.57% White and 1.43% Asian.

There were 30 households, out of which 16.7% had children under the age of 18 living with them, 66.7% were married couples living together, 6.7% had a female householder with no husband present, and 26.7% were non-families. 20.0% of all households were made up of individuals, and 6.7% had someone living alone who was 65 years of age or older. The average household size was 2.33 and the average family size was 2.73.

In the city, the population was spread out, with 14.3% under the age of 18, 10.0% from 18 to 24, 22.9% from 25 to 44, 35.7% from 45 to 64, and 17.1% who were 65 years of age or older. The median age was 46 years. For every 100 females, there were 100.0 males. For every 100 females age 18 and over, there were 93.5 males.

The median income for a household in the city was $42,917, and the median income for a family was $43,333. Males had a median income of $29,375 versus $25,625 for females. The per capita income for the city was $17,458. There were no families and 2.5% of the population living below the poverty line, including no under eighteens and none of those over 64.

Education
Vining is within the South Tama County Community School District.

References

Cities in Tama County, Iowa
Cities in Iowa